Everaldo is a given name. It may refer to:

 Everaldo (footballer, 1944–1974), Everaldo Marques da Silva, Brazilian football left-back
 Everaldo Costa Azevedo (born 1944), Brazilian boxer
 Everaldo Pereira (born 1956), Brazilian pastor, businessman and politician
 Everaldo Matsuura (born 1970), Brazilian chess player
 Everaldo Begines (born 1971), Mexican football manager and former forward
 Everaldo (footballer, born 1974), Everaldo Batista Veveu, Brazilian football centre-back
 Everaldo dos Santos (born 1974), Brazilian football forward
 Everaldo Barbosa (born 1975), Brazilian football midfielder
 Everaldo Coelho (born 1978), Brazilian graphic designer
 Everaldo de Jesus Pereira (born 1980), known as Cabore, Brazilian football forward
 Everaldo Ferreira (born 1982), Brazilian football striker
 Everaldo (footballer, born 1991), Everaldo Stum, Brazilian football striker
 Everaldo (footballer, born 1994), Everaldo Silva do Nascimento, Brazilian football winger